Storvika or Storvik is a village in the municipality of Gildeskål in Nordland county, Norway.

Media gallery

References

Villages in Nordland
Gildeskål